The women's shot put event at the 1985 IAAF World Indoor Games was held at the Palais Omnisports Paris-Bercy on 18 January.

Results

References

Shot
Shot put at the World Athletics Indoor Championships